Alfred Onions (30 October 1858 – 5 July 1921) was a Welsh Labour Party politician.

Born in St George's, Shropshire in England, Onions began work at the age of ten-and-a-half.  He followed his father into coal mining, later relocating to work in Monmouthshire.

Onions became the secretary of the Monmouth District of the Monmouthshire and South Wales District Miners' Association in 1888, serving until 1898, when it became part of the South Wales Miners' Federation (SWMF).  His peers selected him to represent all the miners of South Wales at the International Miners' Conference in Paris in 1891.  He was later the first treasurer of the SWMF.

Onions was active in the Liberal-Labour movement, serving on local school boards, then on Monmouth County Council, becoming its chair.  He was also the first chair of Risca Urban District Council.  As the SWMF moved to support the Labour Party, Onions followed.

He was elected as member of parliament (MP) for Caerphilly at the 1918 general election, but died in office in 1921, aged 62.  His successor was Morgan Jones.

References

 

1858 births
1921 deaths
Welsh Labour Party MPs
Members of the Parliamentary Committee of the Trades Union Congress
Miners' Federation of Great Britain-sponsored MPs
UK MPs 1918–1922